Hyperparachma congrualis is a species of snout moth in the genus Hyperparachma. It was described by Hans Georg Amsel in 1956, and is known from Venezuela.

References

Chrysauginae
Moths of South America
Moths described in 1956
Invertebrates of Venezuela